Lepava Mušović (born 13 January 1940), known professionally as Lepa Lukić, is a Serbian folk singer with a career spanning more than six decades. One of her biggest hits is "Srce je moje violina" (My Heart is a Violin).

Early life and family
Lepava Mušović in the village of Miločaj near Kraljevo in Serbia, at the time part of Kingdom of Yugoslavia. Contrary to most sources, Lepava was actually born 13 January 1940, rather than 16 January 1940 when she was given a birth certificate. Her father, Radisav, died in 1942, at age 30, when Lepava was two years old. Her mother, Milosija (1913–2007), lived to the age of 94. Lepava has one older brother, Radomir, born in 1936.

Career
Lepava began singing at about the age of ten, circa 1950 in her village. Her professional singing career began in the 1960s, when she recorded duets with singers Mića Stojanović and Gvozden Radičević.

At the beginning of her professional career, Lukić wished to sing as a soloist instead of in the then-popular duet format. During a concert in Aleksandrovac, Lukić expressed her desire to sing as a soloist to accordion player and composer Radojka Živković (1923–2002). At first hesitant, Živković agreed after Lepa began crying and begging her to allow her to prove herself as a solo singer. Upon hearing Lepa sing one song, Živković asked her to sing a second, a third, and a fourth.

There are two versions of how Lepa Lukić got her solo recording deal. Her version says that on a bus ride to Belgrade in 1967, the composer Petar Tanasijević was sitting behind her and tapped her shoulder and asked her if she wanted to record as a soloist, which she immediately agreed to. The next day, Tanasijević offered her the song "Od izvora dva putića" (From the Spring of Two Roads), which she recorded along with three other songs for her first album, released in 1967. The other version of the story, as told by Petar Tanasijević, was that one night in autumn of 1964, on a bus ride to Aleksandrovac, he was sitting in front of Lepa as she sang a song which annoyed him, so he asked her to stop. She looked at him in defiance and continued singing. After they arrived to Belgrade and got off the bus, he asked somebody who that "uncivilized" girl on the bus was. He was told that she was just a "kafana singer". During the concert that night, he was in the audience when Lepa came onto the stage with accordion player Radojka Živković to sing. He said that he shuddered and a chill went down his spine when he heard her voice on stage, even comparing her to popular sevdalinka singer Nada Mamula. After her performance, he found her backstage and congratulated her. He promised to write a song for her and she said "I love you. Help me get out of the kafanas. I'm sick of everything." As his version of the story goes, one year later he composed the song "Od izvora dva putića" and thought of her. He contacted her and gave her the song.

Although she never met novelist Ivo Andrić (1892–1975), it was rumored that he liked her song "Vremena su prošla stara" (Old Times Have Passed), also written by Petar Tanasijević.

Personal life
Lukić has been married three times. Her third husband is named Milan Milanović. She did not have children with any of her husbands.

She was a friend of footballer Miljan Miljanić (1930–2012), as well as Bosnian singer Silvana Armenulić (1939–1976), with whom she was asked to perform with at Silvana's final concert the night she died in 1976, but overslept for the first time in her career and did not make it to the concert. Had she gone, she believes she would have lost her life in the car accident that killed Silvana and her sister Mirsada Mirjana Bajraktarević. In 2013, Lepa revealed in an interview that she hasn't driven a car since Silvana's death, out of fear that she would share the same fate as the two sisters.

References

1940 births
Living people
Musicians from Kraljevo
20th-century Serbian women singers
Yugoslav women singers
Grand Production artists
Serbian folk singers
Parovi